The Frobenius Institute (Frobenius-Institut; originally: Forschungsinstitut fur Kulturmorphologie) is Germany's oldest anthropological research institute.  Founded in 1925, it is named after Leo Frobenius.  The institution is located at Gruneburgplatz 1 in Frankfurt am Main. An autonomous organization, it is associated with the Johann Wolfgang Goethe University, and works in collaboration with two other organizations, the Institut für Ethnologie, and the Museum der Weltkulturen. It carries out ethnological and historical research. Originally established in Munich and known as the Forschungsinstitut fur Kulturmorphologie, it was renamed by Adolf Ellegard Jensen, its director after the 1938 death of Frobenius.

Collection 
The Frobenius Institute is famous for its collections. Apart from 6000 ethnographic objects, the collection mainly consists of around 100,000 pictures (photographs and watercolour paintings). Most of these pictures are available online on the website of the institute. Leo Frobenius started this collection, and after his death in 1938 his successors enlarged it. The Library of the Frobenius Institute consists of around 130,000 books.

External links 
 Frobenius Institute website

Literature 
 Das Frobenius-Institut an der Johann Wolfgang Goethe-Universität. 1898-1998. Vorwort: Karl-Heinz Kohl. Frankfurt am Main, Frobenius Institut, 1998

References

Research institutes in Germany
Anthropological research institutes
Research institutes established in 1925
Education in Frankfurt